Benny Beaver is the official mascot of Oregon State University and winner of the 2011 Capital One Mascot of the Year write-in campaign. The exact date of when the name was first used as the university's mascot is not known, but photographs in the school's yearbook document its use as early as the 1940s.

Mascot history

The university's school newspaper is the first known organization on campus to adopt the beaver as its namesake and did so as early as 1908. The school yearbook's long use of the name, known as "The Beaver" starting in 1916, eventually helped solidify the beaver as the university's official mascot. The popularity of the beaver was also shared by students at University of Oregon. For several early publishings, students at this school also used "The Beaver" as their yearbook's title.

Oregon State University's first documented use of "Benny Beaver" was found in a photograph showing students posing next to a statue of a beaver inscribed with the name "Benny Beaver." The photograph appears in the 1942 edition of the yearbook.

Prior to the beaver, Oregon State's mascot was an individual known as John Richard Newton Bell (1893–1928). A longtime member of the university's board of regents, Bell became hugely popular among the students for his ritual of marching to the Marys River after each of Oregon State's victories over Oregon. He was said to have tossed his top hat into the water as a token of celebration. Earlier mascots include "Jimmie" the Coyote (1892–1893) and "Bulldog" (1906–1910, unofficial and for specific teams only, such as the Wrestling squad). The beaver mascot's name, "Benny," was officially adopted in 1945. Two failed attempts to maintain a live beaver mascot include Bevo Beaver (rescued from Mary's River in 1921 and later stolen ) and Billy Beaver.

The early Benny Beaver "cartoon" icon/logo was created by famous graphic illustrator, and former Disney employee, Arthur C. Evans. As the art director for Angelus Pacific Company, Evans submitted his design to OSU and it was approved for use in 1951. His logos were used at hundreds of other universities and high schools throughout the nation. Evans' beaver logo also appeared in the 1985 movie Teen Wolf.

During the 1940s, students carted a beaver statue in parades throughout the state and around the stadium on game days. The statue was patterned after an earlier bronze statue that also went by the name "Benny."  Although the name "Benny" was adopted prior to the 1940s, a 1941 yearbook picture captions the statue as "Bill Beaver". The following yearbook (1942) a photo of the same beaver statue is cited with the name "Benny Beaver". After the statue's demise, the name "Benny" was regularly used in a popular sports column in The Daily Barometer - known as "The Gnawed Log."

The first live appearance during an athletic event by a mascot named "Benny", was September 18, 1952 and performed by Ken Austin. Austin later founded Newberg, Oregon-based A-dec, the largest privately held dental equipment manufacturer in North America. Austin is now a major Oregon State donor.

Between the early 1980s and mid-1990s, Benny was often joined at sporting events by a co-mascot, known as "Bernice Beaver."

In 1998 No Dinx, a graphic design shop in Albany, Oregon, redesigned the logo for the first time in nearly 50 years (shown below). In March 2013, working together with Nike, Oregon State University unveiled the latest, newly redesigned version, of the Benny Beaver logo. The new logo replaced the No Dinx design. The Benny Beaver costume also changed to match the new logo in 2001. Benny wears #0 at football games and #0 at basketball games. Past numbers have included #100 (football) and #6 (basketball).

In December 2010, Benny Beaver was ranked 13th on a list titled 20 Worst Behaved Mascots Of All Time. Despite the bad press, Benny Beaver won the 2011 Capital One Mascot of the Year write-in campaign, earning the mascot program $1000 and inclusion in the following year's Capital One All-America Mascot Team.

References

Pac-12 Conference mascots
Fictional beavers
Oregon State Beavers
1942 establishments in Oregon
Rodent mascots